is the name of a series of J-pop groups mainly consisting of Japanese gravure idols and AV idols, under the Pony Canyon record label. The original group was established in 2008 as part of the TV Tokyo's variety show  which first aired in April 2008. Their first single, released in 2010, reached number 8 in sales on Oricon’s singles chart. They held their first live show in July 2010 in Shibuya, Tokyo.

The group did not have a permanent roster but members were rotated in and out. By mid-2012 there were 29 active members and 45 had retired. At that time the group was led by AV Idol Yuma Asami who had been with the group from the start. The group disbanded and held its last concert on April 7, 2013 after a farewell tour. Longtime member Yuma Asami participated in the final concert despite having recently had major surgery.

A successor group named "Ebisu★Muscats" was formed in September 2015, but the name was changed to Ebisu Muscats 1.5 in October 2017.

Ebisu Muscats (2008–2013)

Members
Final lineup:

 Aino Kishi - 3rd Leader of Ebisu Muscats
 Yuma Asami - 2nd Leader of Ebisu Muscats
 Akiho Yoshizawa
 Rio (Tina Yuzuki)
 Sora Aoi - 1st Leader of Ebisu Muscats
 Shou Nishino
 Minori Hatsune
 Jessica Kizaki
 Aika Ando
 Asami Ogawa
 Rin Sakuragi
 Rina Rukawa
 Kaho Kasumi
 Ayako Yamanaka
 Nanako Kodama
 Ena Kawamura
 Manami Yamaguchi
 Airi Nagasaku
 Haruka Ogura
 Ai Sayama
 Mui Kuriyama
 Yuria Satomi
 Saemi Shinohara
 Yui
 Yuri Oshikawa
 Hana Haruna
 Anna Anjo
 Rika Kawamura
 Rion Sakamoto
 Airi Kijima

Former members:

 Ano Aruru
 Ami
 Hina Kurumi
 Momoka Sugihara
 Kei Megumi
 Lemon Mizutama
 Moka
 Emiru Momose
 Saki Kataoka
 Yuko Shouji
 Kaho Natsumi
 Momoko Nishizono
 Natsuki Wakasugi
 Shiori Tsukimi
 Kozue Sakurai
 Rei Toda
 Yurisa
 Erika Kirihara
 Mio Kirino
 Nozomi Agawa
 Tsubasa Amami
 Akie Harada
 An Mashiro
 Kotomi Nagisa
 Miina Minamoto
 Sayoko Ohashi
 Mao Ichijō
 Kaera Uehara
 Haruna Orii
 Risa Kasumi
 Erika Kirihara
 Riri Kuribayashi
 Konan
 Eri Ouka
 Shoko Shibata
 Maki Sonoda
 Yumi Nagase
 Yuria Hayashida
 Natsuki Fukunishi / Ririka
 Akane Fujisaki
 Miyu Misaki
 Uruha Mizuki
 Mihiro
 Makoto Yuki
 Miyuki Yokoyama
 Maria Ozawa

Discography

Singles
 2010 –  JP #8 
 2010 –  JP #14
 2010 –  JP #17
 2011 –  JP #28
 2011 –  JP #8
 2012 –  JP #13
 2012 –  JP #8
 2012 –  JP #7
 2013 –  JP #22

Album 
 2011 –  JP #17 
 2013 –  JP #8

Ebisu Muscats 2 (formerly Ebisu★Muscats) (2015–2022)

Members
Final lineup:
 Masami Ichikawa (5th Leader of Ebisu Muscats)
 Mai Ishioka 
 Miharu Usa 
 Sae Kanzaki 
 Nanami Kawakami 
 Mirei Kurosawa 
 Sina Tatsumi 
 Rin Matsuoka 
 Akino Fujiwara 
 Yua Mikami
 Kana Momonogi
 Yuki Yoshizawa 
 Mihiro
 Maity / Mai Kasuya
 Saya Kisaragi
 Hiromi Kobayashi
 Moko Sakura
 Yuka Shirafuji
 Natsuki
 Ayumi Nara 
 Yun Matsumoto
 Nanako Miyamura
 Airi Kijima
 Aika Yamagishi
 Yuuri Fukada
 Noa Eikawa
 Riona Hirose

Former members :

 Anri Okita
 Shunka Ayami
 Ai Uehara
 Nami Hoshino
 Aika Usui
 Rika Usui
 Aya Nagase
 Moe Amatsuka
 Nana Ayano
 Rirei
 Yura Sakura
 An Tsujimoto
 Rui Hasegawa
 Tia
 Kirara Asuka (4th-5th Leader of Ebisu Muscats)
 Tsukasa Aoi
 Minami Kojima
 Shiori Kamisaki
 Iori Kogawa
 Su-bu
 Misaki Tamori
 Hanami Natsume
 Riku Minato
 Hanon Hinana
 Marina Shiraishi
 Mayumi Yamanaka
 Tina Nanami
 Ui Mita
 Mary Fujii
 Yura Kano
 Ayaka Tomoda
 Kana Yume

PTA members :

 Sora Aoi
 Yuma Asami
 Rio (Tina Yuzuki)

Discography

Singles
 2015 – TOKYO Sexy Night (TOKYOセクシーナイト)
 2016 – Sexy Beach Honeymoon
 2019 – EBISU ANIMAL ANTHEM
 2019 – Majogarita
 2020 – Digital Noise
 2022 – Seven Colors Story (七色ストーリー)
2023 Night in Tokyo

Album
 2017 – Kidoairaku (喜怒愛楽)
 2020 – Mini Muscats
 2022 – 10th ANNIVERSARY

References

External links
 Official website

 
Musical groups established in 2008
Japanese pop music groups
Japanese idol groups
Japanese girl groups
Pony Canyon artists
Musical groups disestablished in 2013